The Soviet Union had several kinds of country subdivisions: